Nenapinangala is a 2013 Indian Kannada-language film directed by
Dhanuchandra Mavinakunte starring Hemanth, Supreetha, Ramesh Bhat and Sudha Belawadi in lead roles.

Cast

 Hemanth as Surya
 Supreetha as Pallavi
 Ramesh Bhat
 Sudha Belawadi 
 Karibasavaiah
 Ninasam Ashwath
 Nagendra Urs
 Shankar Bhat
 Dr Chikkahejjaji Mahadev
 Shashikala
 Vishwa
 Kuri Sunil
 Chitra Shenoy

Music

Reception

Critical response 

Srikanth Srinivasa of Rediff.com scored the film at 2 out of 5 stars and says "Nenapinangala is a reasonably good movie given that a bunch of newcomers are involved in its making. It has some excellent performances by Supreetha and Ramesh Bhat" The Times of India scored the film at 3 out of 5 stars and wrote "Hemanth, though impressive, has to get training in expression and body language. Ramesh Bhat is graceful. Music director CR Bobby has given some excellent numbers. G Renukumar’s cinematography is okay". Bangalore Mirror scored the film at 3 out of 5 stars and wrote "CR Bobby has managed to give a few melodious tunes. At least, three songs stand out for its quality. Renukumar as the cinematographer passes muster. The minus points are the comedy that are wasted and the length that that should have been pruned at the editing table". B S Srivani of Deccan Herald wrote "He stretches the climax unnecessarily and all the good work comes nearly undone with it. Story is nothing out of the ordinary, but this is a rare instance of performances, music and dialogues all pitching in to transform ordinary into extraordinary. This playground of memories has plenty of positives to take home".

References

External links 
 

2013 drama films
2010s Kannada-language films
2013 films
Indian drama films